John Stanley "Happy Jack" Cameron (born September 22, 1884 – July 12, 1963) was a Canadian Major League Baseball outfielder.

External links

1884 births
1963 deaths
Boston Beaneaters players
Baseball people from Nova Scotia
Canadian expatriate baseball players in the United States
Fall River Indians players
Lawrence Colts players
Lowell Tigers players
Major League Baseball outfielders
Major League Baseball players from Canada
Worcester Busters players